The committees of the 4th Supreme People's Assembly (SPA) were elected by the 1st Session of the aforementioned body on 16 December 1967. It was replaced on 28 December 1972 by the committees of the 5th Supreme People's Assembly.

Committees

Bills

Budget

Credentials

Foreign Affairs

References

Citations

Bibliography
Books:
 

4th Supreme People's Assembly
1967 establishments in North Korea
1972 disestablishments in North Korea